Manhyia North  is one of the constituencies represented in the Parliament of Ghana. It elects one Member of Parliament (MP) by the first past the post system of election. Manhyia North  is located in the City of  Kumasi Metropolitan District   of the Ashanti Region of Ghana.

Boundaries 
The seat is located within the Kumasi Metropolitan District of the Ashanti Region of Ghana.

Members of Parliament

References 

Parliamentary constituencies in the Ashanti Region
Kumasi